Mutiu Adepoju (born 22 December 1970) is a Nigerian former professional footballer who played mostly as an attacking midfielder.

He spent most of his career in Spain, amassing La Liga totals of 175 games and 22 goals over the course of seven seasons and representing mainly Racing de Santander and Real Sociedad.

A Nigeria international for 12 years, Adepoju appeared for the country in three World Cups and as many Africa Cup of Nations.

Club career
Born in Ibadan, Adepoju (also called by his first name in Spain) left Nigeria in 1989 to join Real Madrid, but never made it past their reserves. The 1992–93 season was impressive as he scored 11 Segunda División goals to help Racing de Santander return to La Liga, and he continued to feature regularly for the Cantabrians the next three years.

Mutiu left for Real Sociedad for 1996–97 but, after a solid first campaign, struggled heavily to hold down a regular place with the Basques. In 2001–02 he represented Saudi Arabia's Al-Ittihad Club (Jeddah), but quickly returned to Spain where he featured rarely for second division club UD Salamanca.

After two more weak years, in Turkey and Cyprus, Adepoju retired in 2006 in Spain's lower leagues. He subsequently returned to his first team Shooting Stars FC, as general manager.

International career
Adepoju was a member of the Nigeria U20 team that played in the 1989 FIFA World Youth Championship. His brace against the United States (which featured Kasey Keller in goal) in the semi-finals ensured a final against Portugal, a 2–0 defeat.

Adepoju went on to collect 48 caps for the full side, with six goals. He made his debut against Togo in August 1990, but his breakthrough came during the 1992 Africa Cup of Nations, and he helped his nation win the next continental edition.

Adepoju was part of the squads for the FIFA World Cups in 1994, 1998 – where he scored in a 3–2 win against Spain– and 2002, although he did not play in the latter tournament.

References

External links
Nigerian Players profile

1970 births
Living people
Sportspeople from Ibadan
Yoruba sportspeople
Nigerian footballers
Association football midfielders
Nigeria Professional Football League players
Shooting Stars S.C. players
La Liga players
Segunda División players
Segunda División B players
Tercera División players
Real Madrid Castilla footballers
Racing de Santander players
Real Sociedad footballers
UD Salamanca players
CD Eldense footballers
Saudi Professional League players
Ittihad FC players
Süper Lig players
Samsunspor footballers
Cypriot First Division players
AEL Limassol players
Nigeria under-20 international footballers
Nigeria international footballers
1992 African Cup of Nations players
1994 African Cup of Nations players
1994 FIFA World Cup players
1995 King Fahd Cup players
1998 FIFA World Cup players
2000 African Cup of Nations players
2002 FIFA World Cup players
Africa Cup of Nations-winning players
Nigerian expatriate footballers
Expatriate footballers in Spain
Expatriate footballers in Saudi Arabia
Expatriate footballers in Turkey
Expatriate footballers in Cyprus
Nigerian expatriate sportspeople in Spain
Nigerian expatriate sportspeople in Saudi Arabia
Nigerian expatriate sportspeople in Turkey
Nigerian expatriate sportspeople in Cyprus